Kevin Stanley Rohleder (7 April 1920 – 14 August 1983) was an Australian rules footballer who had played with St Kilda in the Victorian Football League (VFL).	His brother, Noel Rohleder, played one game for South Melbourne.

The son of Veronica Harriet Stanley (1899–1970), Kevin Stanley was born at Carlton, Victoria on 7 April 1920. He later took the surname Rohleder after his mother married Walter John Rohleder (1897–1982) in 1923.

Having initially come to attention playing with Altona, Rohleder transferred to Williamstown in 1941 but played only a single game against Port Melbourne before being dropped back to the seconds. In mid 1942 Rohleder enlisted in the Australian Army, where he served until the end of World War II.

In May 1943, while serving in Melbourne, Rohleder gained a permit to play with St Kilda. He played five games for St Kilda that season before the Army transferred him to Queensland, where he played both Australian Rules Football and Rugby League.

Notes

External links 

Kevin Rohleder's playing statistics from The VFA Project

1920 births
1983 deaths
Australian rules footballers from Melbourne
Williamstown Football Club players
St Kilda Football Club players
People from Carlton, Victoria
Military personnel from Melbourne
Australian Army personnel of World War II